Austin Eli Wing (February 3, 1792 – August 27, 1849) was a politician in Michigan, serving as delegate to the U.S. Congress from Michigan Territory before it became the state of Michigan. Later he was elected to Congress, serving from 1825 to 1829, and from 1831 to 1833. After serving in the state house, he also served in various appointed positions.

Life
Wing was born in Conway, Massachusetts, and in early youth moved with his parents to Marietta, Ohio. He attended common schools and the academy at Chillicothe and Ohio University. He  graduated from Williams College, Williamstown, Massachusetts, in 1814.

He moved to Detroit, Michigan, where he was elected as a National Republican to the Nineteenth and Twentieth Congresses, serving from March 4, 1825, to March 3, 1829. He moved to Monroe, where he was elected to the Twenty-second Congress, serving from March 4, 1831, to March 3, 1833.

Wing joined the Whig Party after its formation and became a member of the Michigan House of Representatives in 1842. He served as a member of the board of regents of the University of Michigan from 1845 until 1849. He was appointed as United States Marshal for the district of Michigan on February 24, 1846, and served until 1849.

Austin Eli Wing died in Cleveland, Ohio. He was interred in Woodland Cemetery in Monroe, Michigan.

References

External links

The Political Graveyard

1792 births
1849 deaths
Burials at Woodland Cemetery (Monroe, Michigan)
Delegates to the United States House of Representatives from Michigan Territory
Members of the Michigan House of Representatives
Regents of the University of Michigan
Michigan Whigs
19th-century American politicians
Politicians from Marietta, Ohio
People from Conway, Massachusetts
People from Monroe, Michigan
Ohio University alumni
Williams College alumni
United States Marshals